This is a list of films and television programs dubbed into indigenous languages. Indigenous language dubs are often made to promote language revitalisation and usage of the language. The number of films and television programs being dubbed into indigenous languages is growing, particularly in Australia, Canada, New Zealand and the United States.

List

Films

Television programs

See also 

 :Category:Indigenous films by language

References 

Lists of films
Indigenous languages
Dubbing (filmmaking)